The Latin Library is a website that collects public domain Latin texts. It is run by William L. Carey, adjunct professor of Latin and Roman Law at George Mason University. The texts have been drawn from different sources, are not intended for research purposes nor as substitutes for critical editions, and may contain errors. There are no translations at the site.

See also
Latin literature
Corpus Corporum
Library of Latin Texts

References

External links
 

Latin-language literature
Computing in classical studies
American digital libraries